Liddell is a surname.

Liddell may also refer to:

Places 
 Lake Liddell
 Liddell, New South Wales
 Liddell Archeological Site
 Lidell Creek
 Liddell Power Station, a coal-powered thermal power station

Other uses 
 Lidell Townsell, house-music artist
 Studio Liddell, a British computer animation and imagery production studio

See also 
 Liddel (disambiguation)